Y. S. Avinash Reddy is an Indian politician who is the Member of Parliament in 16th Lok Sabha and 17th Lok Sabha  from Kadapa (Lok Sabha constituency), Andhra Pradesh. He won the Indian general elections of 2014 and 2019 being a YSR Congress Party candidate.

Political career 
In April 2018, he along with his party MPs resigned for their posts in protest for not giving special status to Andhra Pradesh and issued a no-confidence notice on the government.

General Elections 2014

General Elections 2019

References

External links
 Official biographical sketch in Parliament of India website

1984 births
Living people
Alumni of the University of Worcester
India MPs 2014–2019
YSR Congress Party politicians
Lok Sabha members from Andhra Pradesh
People from Kadapa district
Telugu politicians
India MPs 2019–present